Doniphan may refer to:

Places
In the United States:
 Doniphan, Kansas
 Doniphan, Missouri
 Doniphan, Nebraska
 Doniphan County, Kansas

People
 Alexander William Doniphan

See also
 Donovan (disambiguation)